Ivan Fyodorovich Dychko (born 11 August 1990) is a Kazakhstani professional boxer. As an amateur he won bronze medals at the 2012 and 2016 Summer Olympics.

Amateur career
At the 2008 AIBA Youth World Boxing Championships Dychko defeated American cruiserweight Contender Nick Kisner in the quarterfinals 5–1. Then went on to lose 8:10 to Erislandy Savon, in the final match to earn a silver medal. He moved up to super heavyweight a year later, winning his first of three national championships at the weight. At the 2009 World Amateur Boxing Championships, he was eliminated after losing his second bout 11:15 to Denis Sergeev. At the 2010 Asian Games, Dycho defeated Iranian Rouhollah Hosseini 6:4 in the semifinal but lost the final 5:7 to local favorite Zhang Zhilei. In 2011 he beat Roman Kapitanenko 9:4 at a local tournament. At the 2011 AIBA World Boxing Championships, he got past Zhilei 13:7 and Croat Filip Hrgovic but lost the semi final to eventual winner Magomedrasul Majidov 9:16.

At the 2012 Olympics, he beat German boxer Erik Pfeifer 14–4 and Canadian boxer Simon Kean to win the bronze medal. He lost the semifinal to Anthony Joshua 13–11.

At the 2013 World Championships, Dychko beat Satish Kumar and Pfeifer to reach the final once again, where he was to rematch Majidov. Majidov got a convincing win by knocking Dychko out in the final round despite the latter winning the first 2 rounds. Dychko was first knocked down by an overhand. He'd get up but after the referee resumed the fight, Majidov landed the same shot and knocked down Dychko once again. At that point, the referee stopped the fight. Dychko bounced back by winning a gold medal at the 2014 Asian Games. Dychko would reach the final once again at the 2015 World Championships, but he lost to Tony Yoka 0:3.

At the 2016 Olympics, Dychko vanquished Majidov in the first round but would settle for a bronze once again, after losing to Joe Joyce in the semifinals. His amateur record is 181–18.

Professional career
Dychko announced he was turning pro in February 2017. He said he was looking for a rematch against world champion Anthony Joshua. On his debut, Dychko, an abnormally tall boxer, was matched against 6'11 Aubur Wright, an even taller fighter. He was nevertheless able to convincingly beat Wright, stopping him after just 2 minutes in the first round.

Professional boxing record

References

External links
 
 
 
 
 
 

1990 births
Living people
Heavyweight boxers
Boxers at the 2012 Summer Olympics
Boxers at the 2016 Summer Olympics
Olympic boxers of Kazakhstan
Olympic bronze medalists for Kazakhstan
Olympic medalists in boxing
Asian Games medalists in boxing
Boxers at the 2010 Asian Games
Boxers at the 2014 Asian Games
Medalists at the 2012 Summer Olympics
Medalists at the 2016 Summer Olympics
Kazakhstani male boxers
AIBA World Boxing Championships medalists
Asian Games gold medalists for Kazakhstan
Asian Games silver medalists for Kazakhstan
Medalists at the 2010 Asian Games
Medalists at the 2014 Asian Games
21st-century Kazakhstani people